Ribariće is a village located in the municipality of Tutin, Serbia. According to the 2011 census, the village has a population of 947 inhabitants. The Crna Reka Monastery is located near the village.

References

Populated places in Raška District